Jarred Shaw (born September 28, 1990) is an American professional basketball player for Trouville of the Liga Uruguaya de Básquetbol (LUB).

Professional career 
On October 31, 2015, Shaw was selected by the Santa Cruz Warriors with the 18th overall pick in the 2015 NBA Development League Draft. He signed for Dorados de Chihuahua of the Liga Nacional de Baloncesto Profesional (LNBP) in August 2019. In February 2020 he signed for Club Trouville of Montevideo, Uruguay, and played during the 2019–20 LUB season.

Career statistics 

|-
| align="left" | 2017-18
| align="left" | Fukushima
|59 ||24 || 18.3 ||.496  || .280 ||.696 || 5.3 || 0.8 || 0.4 ||0.6  || 11.8
|-

References

1990 births
Living people
American expatriate basketball people in Argentina
American expatriate basketball people in Japan
American expatriate basketball people in Mexico
American expatriate basketball people in Thailand
American expatriate basketball people in Turkey
American expatriate basketball people in Uruguay
Club Africain basketball players
Dorados de Chihuahua (LNBP) players
Fukushima Firebonds players
Oklahoma State Cowboys basketball players
Santa Cruz Warriors players
Utah State Aggies men's basketball players
American men's basketball players
Centers (basketball)
Power forwards (basketball)